Skyline was an airline based in Lagos, Nigeria operating chartered and scheduled domestic passenger flights out of Port Harcourt Airport. It was established in March 1999 and started operations in June 1999. In 2003, the airline ceased to exist.

Fleet 

The Skyline fleet consisted of 3 canadair dhc 7 aircraft.

References

Defunct airlines of Nigeria
Airlines established in 1999
Airlines disestablished in 2003
Defunct companies based in Lagos
2003 disestablishments in Nigeria
Nigerian companies established in 1999